Jo Sik (July 10, 1501 – February 21, 1572) was a Korean philosopher, poet, and politician during the Joseon Dynasty. He was a Neo-Confucian scholar who had a major influence on the Easterners and the Northerners.

Life 
Jo sik was born in Togol, South Gyeongsang Province, in 1501.

Works 
 Nammyeong jip (남명집 南冥集)
 Nammyeong hakgi (남명학기 南冥學記)
 Sinmeongsado (신명사도 神明舍圖)
 Pahan japgi (파한잡기 破閑雜記)
 Nammeong hakgi yupyeon (남명학기유편 南冥學記類編)
 Nammyeong ga (남명가 南冥歌)
 Gwonseonjiro ga (권선지로가 勸善指路歌)

See also 
 Yi Hwang
 Jeong Gu
 Yi I
 Seong Hon
 Yi Eonjeok

External links
 Nammyung Jo Sik's memorial 
 Nammyeong Jo Sik: teacher, philosopher and inspiration for the anti-Japanese resistance armies 

1501 births
1572 deaths
16th-century Korean philosophers
16th-century Korean poets
Joseon scholar-officials
Korean Confucianists
Korean male poets
Korean scholars
Neo-Confucian scholars